Carolyn Epstein Turchin (born March 21, 1945) is a retired United States magistrate judge.

Education
She received her undergraduate degree from the University of California, Berkeley, in 1966 and her law degree from Loyola Law School in 1978.

Law career
Judge Turchin was appointed in 1991, and served as Chief Magistrate Judge from 1995 to 2000.  Prior to her appointment, she was previously a civil litigation attorney and an Assistant United States Attorney in the United States Attorney's Office for the Central District of California.  As an Assistant United States Attorney, she served as Deputy Chief of Criminal Complaints and Deputy Chief of the Training Section.  Before becoming a lawyer, she was a public school teacher for ten years, and also was a probation officer.

Judge Turchin's courtroom is located in the Edward R. Roybal Federal Building and United States Courthouse in Los Angeles. Magistrate Judge Carolyn Turchin, retired in May 2010.

Personal life
Carolyn is married to Marc E. Turchin, a former Deputy Attorney General of California.

References 

United States District Court for the Central District of California biography 

1945 births
Living people
American women lawyers
American women judges
Loyola Law School alumni
University of California, Berkeley alumni
United States magistrate judges
21st-century American women